Daniel Stephen Roberts (born June 29, 1989 in Reading) is a British-American soccer player.

Career
Roberts played college soccer at University of North Carolina Wilmington between 2008 and 2011. During his time at UNCW, Roberts also played for USL Premier Development League club Carolina Dynamo in 2009 and 2010.

On January 17, 2012 Roberts was drafted in the fourth round (75th overall) of the 2012 MLS Supplemental Draft by Houston Dynamo, but was not signed by the club.

Roberts signed his first professional contract with USL Professional Division club Wilmington Hammerheads on April 2, 2012.

References

External links
 UNCW profile

1989 births
Living people
American soccer players
UNC Wilmington Seahawks men's soccer players
North Carolina Fusion U23 players
Wilmington Hammerheads FC players
USL League Two players
USL Championship players
Houston Dynamo FC draft picks
Association football midfielders
Houston Dynamo FC non-playing staff
People from Sugar Land, Texas
Soccer players from Texas
Sportspeople from the Houston metropolitan area